Gábor Zavadszky (10 September 1974 – 7 January 2006) was a Hungarian footballer.

Club career
Zavadszky was a midfielder and first played for MTK Hungária FC and Ferencvárosi Torna Club in his hometown Budapest. In early 2005 he joined Apollon Limassol in Cyprus, where he last stood under contract.

International career
He represented the Hungarian national team at the 1996 Summer Olympics in Atlanta, where Hungary failed to progress from the group stage.

Death
Zavadszky died on 7 January 2006 in Limassol from an embolism.

Honours

Ferencvárosi TC
Nemzeti Bajnokság I: 1995, 1996
Runner up: 1998
Magyar Kupa: 1993, 1994, 1995
Szuperkupa: 1993, 1994, 1995

Dunaferr SE
Nemzeti Bajnokság I: 2000

MTK Hungária
Nemzeti Bajnokság I: 2003
Szuperkupa: 2003

External links 
R.I.P. Gábor Zavadszky (video)

References 

1974 births
2006 deaths
Footballers from Budapest
Hungarian footballers
Hungary international footballers
Hungary under-21 international footballers
Hungarian expatriate footballers
Nemzeti Bajnokság I players
Cypriot First Division players
MTK Budapest FC players
Ferencvárosi TC footballers
Apollon Limassol FC players
Association football midfielders
Footballers at the 1996 Summer Olympics
Olympic footballers of Hungary
Deaths from embolism
Expatriate footballers in Cyprus